Matongé, Matongué or Matonge may refer to:

Matongé (Kinshasa), an area of Kinshasa, Democratic Republic of the Congo
Matongé, a part of the municipality of Ixelles in Brussels, Belgium known for its Congolese community